Tarqui is an urban parish (parroquia) in Pastaza Canton, Pastaza, Ecuador.

Parishes of Ecuador
Populated places in Pastaza Province